El Condor Pasa (March 17, 1995 – July 16, 2002)  was an American-bred, Japanese-trained Thoroughbred racehorse. In 1998 he won the NHK Mile Cup and the Japan Cup. In the following year he was campaigned in Europe where he won the Grand Prix de Saint-Cloud and the Prix Foy before finishing second in the Prix de l'Arc de Triomphe. He was retired to stud but died after three seasons following unsuccessful colic surgery. El Condor Pasa has been described as the best Japanese racehorse of the 20th century.

Background
El Condor Pasa was a dark bay horse with a large white star bred in Kentucky by his Japanese owner Takashi Watanabe. His sire, Kingmambo was a highly successful breeding stallion. His progeny included the British Classic winners Light Shift, Russian Rhythm, King's Best, Henrythenavigator, Virginia Waters and Rule of Law as well as major winners in Japan, France (Divine Proportions) and the United States (Lemon Drop Kid). Watanabe sent the horse into training with Yoshi Ninomiya, who operated a small stable with only ten horses.

El Condor Pasa was named after the Peruvian musical play of the same name, as Watanabe had a peer in his alma meter (Keio University) that he respected that spent time in Peru; as well as expanding his sire's partial name (Mambo) to mean "South American music" in general. This was the not the first horse Watanabe named "El Condor Pasa", as he owned another horse of the same name several years prior although he suffered a fatal injury that required euthanization before he could make his debut.

Racing career
El Condor Pasa won his only race as a two-year-old in 1997. In the following year he won his first four races culminating in a win in the Group One NHK Mile Cup at Tokyo Racecourse on 17 May. After a summer break he returned in October and was tried beyond a mile for the first time when finishing second to Silence Suzuka in the Mainichi Okan. Despite losing his unbeaten record he started 5/1 third favourite for the Japan Cup over one and a half miles on 29 November. Ridden by Masayoshi Ebina, he took the lead in the straight and won by two and a half lengths from the mare Air Groove and the favourite Special Week. His win was enthusiastically received by the crowd of 146,879 and his trainer described the winner as "a hero... he has a huge heart".

In 1999 El Condor Pasa was sent to France where he was trained with the Prix de l'Arc de Triomphe as his objective. On his first European outing he finished second to Croco Rouge in the Prix d'Ispahan at Longchamp Racecourse in May. Two months later he faced opponents from France, Germany and Britain in the Grand Prix de Saint-Cloud. Ebina sent the colt into the lead in the straight and he drew clear to win by two and a half lengths from Tiger Hill and Dream Well, with Sagamix and Borgia among those unplaced. On his final trial for the Arc he defeated Borgia and Croco Rouge in the Prix Foy at Longchamp in September. On 3 October, El Condor Pasa started the 18/5 second favourite for the Arc behind Montjeu, the three-year-old winner of both the Prix du Jockey Club and Irish Derby. El Condor Pasa led from the start and broke clear of the field in the straight to establish a three length advantage. Montjeu emerged as his only challenger, and although El Condor Pasa rallied when the French colt drew alongside him he was overtaken in the last hundred metres and beaten by half a length. The first two were six lengths clear of the third placed Croco Rouge.

Assessment and honours
El Condor Pasa was named Japanese Champion Three-year-old Colt for 1998. Despite never running in Japan during the following year, El Condor Pasa's performances in France led to his being voted the 1999 Japanese Champion Older Horse and Japanese Horse of the Year.

In their book, A Century of Champions, based on the Timeform rating system, John Randall and Tony Morris rated El Condor Pasa the best racehorse trained in Japan in the 20th century.

Stud record
El Condor Pasa was retired from racing to become a breeding stallion at the Shadai Stallion Station in Hokkaido. In July 2002 the horse became gravely ill with horse colic. El Condor Pasa underwent surgery but died at 9.10 p.m. on 16 July.

His three crops of foals contained several major winners including Vermilion (Japan Cup Dirt, February Stakes), Song of Wind (Kikuka Shō) and Alondite (Japan Cup Dirt).

Pedigree 

 El Condor Pasa was inbred 3 × 4 to the stallion Northern Dancer, meaning that Northern Dancer appears once in the third generation and once in the fourth generation of his pedigree.

References

1995 racehorse births
2002 racehorse deaths
Racehorses bred in Kentucky
Racehorses trained in Japan
Thoroughbred family 5-h
Japan Cup winners
Japanese Thoroughbred Horse of the Year